Longcroft may refer to:

Places
Longcroft, Cumbria, England
Longcroft, Falkirk, Scotland

People with the surname
Charles Longcroft, (1883–1958), RAF officer
Okeover Longcroft, (1850–1871), English cricketer

Other uses
Longcroft School, England